Gerak Khas is Malaysian for "special forces". It may refer to:

 Gerak Khas (Malaysian Army unit)
 21 Gerup Gerak Khas, a command overseeing Gerak Khas
 Gerak Khas (TV series), about a special police unit
 Gerak Khas The Movie, a film based on the TV series

See also 
 Pasukan Gerakan Khas, the special operations command of the Royal Malaysia Police